Milton Aubrey "Brew" Moore (March 26, 1924 – August 19, 1973), was an American jazz tenor saxophonist.

Early life 
He was born in Indianola, Mississippi, United States. Moore's formal musical training began at twelve, first on trombone, then clarinet before switching to tenor saxophone. Inspired by the style of Lester Young, he gained his first professional experience playing in a Texas territorial band the summer before entering college.

Professional career 
Moore left the University of Mississippi in his first year to pursue a performing career, with periods in New Orleans, Memphis and New York City (twice) between 1942-47. In New York, he first heard the new music called bebop. As one who idolized Young (he even held his saxophone at the same unorthodox 120 degree angle), Moore was at first uncomfortable with it, but as he recalled for The New York Times critic John S. Wilson in 1968: "When I heard what Bird (Charlie Parker) had done for himself, I realized that Pres was not the complete messiah. So I combined Bird and Pres and my own thing."

Returning to New York in 1948, Moore became a fixture on the city's jazz scene, cutting his first sides as a leader ("Brew Moore and His Playboys,"Savoy Records) and working with Machito's orchestra and Claude Thornhill's Big Band, the Kai Winding sextet, Stan Getz and George Wallington among others. In 1949, he joined three of the "four brothers" from Woody Herman's celebrated Second Herd (Getz, Zoot Sims, Al Cohn) plus Allen Eager in a  session that resulted in the album The Brothers for the Prestige label. In the early 1950s, he gigged with Bird and other beboppers of note at venues like Birdland. Pianist Gene DiNovi described him as "a natural player. I remember him saying once that you should come to the saxophone as a child would—pick it up and blow. He had blond, straw-colored hair. Always with a farmer's cow-lick sticking up. He was a very simple, lovely person."

He left New York in 1954 for the West Coast, settling eventually in San Francisco where he found a congenial environment, fitting well into the beat generation culture personified by one of his acknowledged admirers, Jack Kerouac. In 1959, the heavy drinking that had early on given him his nickname took its toll, and he withdrew from the scene. He subsequently resurfaced in Europe. Based out of Copenhagen, Denmark, he would, with the exception of three years in New York (1967–70), continue to perform there for the rest of his life, teaming with such fellow ex-pats as Kenny Drew and Sahib Shihab as well as European players Niels-Henning Ørsted Pedersen and Alex Riel. In August 1973, back in Copenhagen from a trip home to settle his late father's affairs (and, ironically, after years of economic uncertainty coming into a substantial inheritance), he fell down a flight of stairs in Tivoli Gardens and suffered the injuries that caused his death.

Influence and legacy 
In the liner notes for a Storyville Records issue, critic Alun Morgan suggests in liner notes for the CD reissue No More Brew that Moore's "total discography is small for a man of his musical stature" because of the saxophonist's unswerving adherence to his Lestorian roots.  As critic Scott Yanow observed: "In the early '50s, [Moore] recorded . . . with fellow tenors Stan Getz, Al Cohn, Zoot Sims, and Alan Eager; at the time, they all sounded identical. Moore was the only one of the five who did not change his sound through the years."

Alternatively, Danish scholar Soren Schou has likened Moore's "epic melodist" playing to writing a novel and contrasted it with the concentrated "short story" approach practiced by post-Bird improvisers. Certainly Moore's expansive style of playing tested the attention span of post-bop era listeners. (In evidence of this, one is referred to his X-rated comments to an apparently less than fully engaged Stockholm audience while introducing "Manny's Tune" on "No More Brew," Storyville CD 8275, 1998.)

Moore himself told critic Ralph J. Gleason in 1954: "The idea of playing for me is to compose a different, not always better I'm afraid, melody on the tune and basis of the original song, rather than construct a series of chord progressions around the original chords." An idea the more pre-bop inclined Gleason clearly approved of, noting that Moore "has two absolutely golden gifts.  He swings like mad and he has soul . . . he also has a priceless gift for phrasing. . . . When Brew says it, he says it simply, but it rings true."

Discography

As leader
 The Brew Moore Quintet (Fantasy, 1956)
 Brew Moore (Fantasy, 1958)
 Brew Moore in Europe (Debut, 1962)
 Brew's Stockholm Dew (Sonet, 1972)
 No More Brew (Storyville, 1981)
 Fru'n Brew with Tony Fruscella (Spotlite, 1981)
 If I Had You (SteepleChase, 1982)
 I Should Care (SteepleChase, 1982)
 The 1954 Unissued Atlantic Session with Tony Fruscella (Fresh Sound, 2011)
 Live in Europe 1961 (Sonorama, 2015)

As sideman
 Slim Gaillard, At Birdland (Hep, 1979)
 Stan Getz, The Brothers (Prestige, 1956)
 Ray Nance, Body and Soul (Solid State, 1970)
 Cal Tjader, Tjader Plays Tjazz (Fantasy, 1956)
 Cal Tjader, Latin Kick (Fantasy, 1959)
 George Wallington, The George Wallington Trio (Savoy, 1956)
 Chuck Wayne, The Jazz Guitarist (Savoy, 1956)

Notes

References 
 "Brew Moore Dies; Jazz Musician, 49," The New York Times, August 20, 1973.
 "Brew Moore," Jazz Professional
 Attarian, Hrayr, "Brew Moore," All About Jazz 
 Gardner, Mark, Brew Moore Quartet - I Should Care (Notes) SteepleChase CD 36019 1993 reissue of 1965 broadcast recording
 Gitler, Ira, "Brothers and Other Mothers" (Review) 
 Gleason, Ralph, The Brew Moore Quintet (Notes), Fantasy, 1956 (CD reissue 1993).
 Morgan, Alun, Brew Moore – No More Brew (Notes), Storyville, 1998 (Originally recorded for Danske Radio in 1971.)
 Neely, Mike, "The Brew Moore Quintet" (Review)
 Schou, Søren, "Brew Moore – En Melodisk Epiker," Tidsskrift: Jazz Special, No. 62, 2002.
 Sjösten, Lars, "Remembrances of Brew Moore,"
 Wiedemann, Erik, Brew Moore - Svinget 14 (Notes), Black Lion CD760164, 1991 reissue of 1961 recording.
 Wilson, John S., "Brew Moore, Saxophonist, Back After Two Decades." The New York Times, September 11, 1968.

1924 births
1973 deaths
People from Indianola, Mississippi
American jazz saxophonists
American male saxophonists
20th-century American saxophonists
Jazz musicians from Mississippi
20th-century American male musicians
American male jazz musicians